The following is a list of characters from the Showtime television series The Tudors  (2007–2010).

Characters 
The main cast are listed in credits order.

Recurring

See also
George Throckmorton
Richard Rich, 1st Baron Rich
Margaret (Madge) Shelton
Philippe de Chabot
William Kingston
Hans Holbein the Younger
Elizabeth Boleyn, Countess of Wiltshire, wife of Thomas Boleyn 
Stephen Gardiner
John Lambert (martyr)
Henry Pole, 1st Baron Montagu
Thomas Wriothesley, 1st Earl of Southampton (Lord Risley)
Anne Parr, Countess of Pembroke (Lady Herbert)

Notes

External links 
 The Tudors characters – Showtime

Tudors, The